Wang Na (born 29 May 1995) is a Chinese female racewalking athlete.

Wang's first international success came at the 2014 World Junior Championships in Athletics where she was the 10,000 m walk runner-up to Czech athlete Anežka Drahotová.

Senior success followed at the 2017 Asian Race Walking Championships, which she won over two minutes clear of the runner-up Kumiko Okada. On the circuit that year she was third at the Taicang Race Walking Challenge and runner-up to Lü Xiuzhi at the Chinese National Race Walking Grand Prix. She placed eighth at the 2017 World Championships in Athletics.

International competitions

References

External links

Living people
1995 births
Chinese female racewalkers
World Athletics Championships athletes for China
Universiade medalists in athletics (track and field)
Universiade bronze medalists for China